69230 Hermes is a sub-kilometer sized asteroid and binary system on an eccentric orbit, classified as a potentially hazardous asteroid and near-Earth object of the Apollo group, that passed Earth at approximately twice the distance of the Moon on 30 October 1937. The asteroid was named after Hermes from Greek mythology. It is noted for having been the last remaining named lost asteroid, rediscovered in 2003. The S-type asteroid has a rotation period of 13.9 hours. Its synchronous companion was discovered in 2003.

Discovery 
Hermes was discovered by German astronomer Karl Reinmuth in images taken at Heidelberg Observatory on 28 October 1937. Only four days of observations could be made before it became too faint to be seen in the telescopes of the day. This was not enough to calculate an orbit, and Hermes became a lost asteroid. It thus did not receive a number, but Reinmuth nevertheless named it after the Greek god Hermes. It was the third unnumbered but named asteroid, having only the provisional designation . The two others long lost were (1862) Apollo, discovered in 1932 and numbered 1973, and (2101) Adonis, discovered in 1936 and numbered 1977.

On 15 October 2003, Brian A. Skiff of the LONEOS project made an asteroid observation that, when the orbit was calculated backwards in time (by Timothy B. Spahr, Steven Chesley and Paul Chodas), turned out to be a rediscovery of Hermes. It has been assigned sequential number 69230. Additional precovery observations were published by the Minor Planet Center, the earliest being found in images taken serendipitously by the MPG/ESO 2.2-m La Silla telescope on 16 September 2000.

Naming 
This minor planet was named after the Greek god Hermes, who is the messenger of the gods and son of Zeus and Maia (also see  and ). Recovered and numbered in late 2003, Hermes was originally named by the Astronomical Calculation Institute as early as 1937. The official naming citation was published by the Minor Planet Center on 9 November 2003.

Orbit and classification 
Hermes is an Apollo asteroid, a subgroup of near-Earth asteroids that cross the orbit of Earth. It orbits the Sun at a distance of 0.6–2.7 AU once every 2 years and 2 months (778 days; semi-major axis of 1.66 AU). Its orbit has an eccentricity of 0.62 and an inclination of 6° with respect to the ecliptic. Due to its eccentricity, Hermes is also a Mars- and Venus-crosser. Frequent close approaches to both Earth and Venus make it unusually challenging to forecast its orbit more than a century in advance, though there is no impact risk within that timeframe.

Close approaches 

On 30 October 1937, Hermes passed  from Earth, and on 26 April 1942,  from Earth. In retrospect it turned out that Hermes came even closer to the Earth in 1942 than in 1937, within 1.7 lunar distances; the second pass was unobserved at the height of the Second World War. For decades, Hermes was known to have made the closest known approach of an asteroid to the Earth. Not until 1989 was a closer approach (by 4581 Asclepius) observed. At closest approach, Hermes was moving 5° per hour across the sky and reached 8th magnitude.

Physical characteristics

Spectral type 
Hermes is a stony S-type asteroid, as reported by Andy Rivkin and Richard Binzel. It has been characterized as a Sq-subtype using the SpeX instrument at NASA Infrared Telescope Facility. Sq-types transition to the Q-type asteroid.

Lightcurves 
Three rotational lightcurves of Hermes were obtained from photometric observations in October 2003. Lightcurve analysis gave a well-defined rotation period between 13.892 and 13.894 hours with a brightness variation between and 0.06 and 0.08 magnitude, which indicates that the body has a nearly spherical shape.

Binary system 

Radar observations led by Jean-Luc Margot at Arecibo Observatory and Goldstone in October and November 2003 showed Hermes to be a binary asteroid.

The two components are in double synchronous rotation (similar to the trans-Neptunian system Pluto and Charon). Hermes is one of only four systems of that kind known in the near-Earth object population.

In popular culture 
In the 1978 novel The Hermes Fall by John Baxter, the asteroid endangers the Earth in 1980. It is not explicitly made clear as to whether or not the Hermes asteroid from The Hermes Fall is 69230 Hermes.

Notes

References

External links 
 Arecibo 2003 press release
 Hermes radar results at UCLA
 Asteroids with Satellites, Robert Johnston, johnstonsarchive.net
 Dictionary of Minor Planet Names, Google books
 
 
 

069230
Discoveries by Karl Wilhelm Reinmuth
Named minor planets
069230
069230
069230
19371028